The next Ukrainian presidential election shall be held, per the Constitution of Ukraine, on the last Sunday of March of the fifth year of the incumbent President's term of office, in Spring 2024. However, if a president's term in office ends prematurely, the election of a new president must take place within ninety days of the previous president leaving office. The first round is expected to take place on the last Sunday of March, which falls on 31 March 2024. If no candidate receives an absolute majority, the second round is then expected to take place 3 weeks after the first, on 21 April 2024. These are the same days as the previous presidential election held on 31 March and 21 April 2019. Any potential effect of the 2022 Russian invasion of Ukraine on the election is currently unknown.

Opinion polls

See also
2019 Ukrainian presidential election
Next Ukrainian parliamentary election

References

Presidential elections in Ukraine
Future elections in Europe

Future elections in Ukraine